Enrico "Erri" De Luca (born 20 May 1950, Naples) is an Italian novelist, translator and poet. He has been recognized by critic Giorgio De Rienzo of Corriere della Sera as "the writer of the decade". He is also known for his opposition to the Lyon-Turin high speed train line, and is being sued for having called for its sabotage. On 19 October 2015, De Luca was cleared of inciting criminal damage. He reacted to the not-guilty verdict declaring that "An injustice has been avoided."

Biography
Erri De Luca's original first name was Enrico ("Henry").
 is an Italian version of his uncle's name, "Harry".

Upon completing high school in 1968 Erri De Luca joined the radical left-wing movement . After the organization's disbanding he left political involvement. He worked as a blue-collar worker at the Fiat factory in Turin and at the Catania airport. He was also a truck driver and a mason, working at job sites in Italy, France, and Africa. He rode relief convoys in Yugoslavia during the war between 1993 and 1999.

Erri De Luca is self-taught in several languages including Ancient Hebrew, Swahili, Russian and Yiddish. He has translated books of the Old Testament from Old Hebrew and written commentaries on the Sacred Texts, as a "non-believer".
He has published more than 70 books, numerous collections of short stories and poems, translated into more than 30 languages.

He appeared in a cameo role (of a mechanic) in the film , by Costanza Quadriglio.
Erri De Luca's debut as a screenwriter and leading actor was in the short film  (Beyond the Glass), presented at The Venice Film Festival 2011, Italy, World Premiere. "A night-time conversation between a man and his mother and a trip down memory lane through the phantoms of life. Erri De Luca opens the door to his house, transporting us into the universe of the past."

Again, with "The Nightshift Belongs to the Stars" he was a screenwriter and actor, directed by Edoardo Ponti. The short was on the shortlist for the 2013 Academy Awards and won an award at the 2013 Tribeca Film Festival. In the same year, Erri De Luca began writing the story for the documentary film, "Trees that Walk", and in 2014 he wrote and interpreted, "A Musical Imprinting," a musical biography about his life. 

In 2018 he co-produced the movie "Happy Times", directed by Michael Mayer.

De Luca is a passionate mountain climber. A reclusive character, he currently lives in the countryside of Rome.

Literature
Although he never stopped writing since he was 20, his first book was published in 1989, Non ora, non qui (Not now, not here). Many more books followed, best-sellers in Italy, France and Israel, his work being translated and published in Spain, Portugal, Germany, Sweden, the Netherlands, USA, Brazil, Poland, Norway, Denmark, Romania, Greece, Lithuania, and more. He has himself translated several books of the Bible into Italian, including Exodus, Jonah, Ecclesiastes, and Ruth, and explored various aspects of Judaism, as a non-believer.

In France, he received the France Culture Prize in 1994 for Aceto, arcobaleno, the Laure Bataillon Award in 2002 for Tre cavalli and, also in 2002, the Fémina Étranger for Montedidio, translated in English as God's Mountain. In 2010 he was given the German international literary Petrarca-Preis. He was a member of the jury at the Cannes Festival in 2003. In 2013, he received the European Prize for Literature. In 2016, he received European Book Prize for his novel "Le plus et le moins". In 2020 he received Le prix André Malraux.

Erri De Luca wrote for various newspapers (La Repubblica, Il Corriere della Sera Il Mattino,
Avvenire), and other magazines.

Works

 Non ora, non qui, Feltrinelli, 1989
 Una nuvola come tappeto, Feltrinelli, 1991
 Aceto, Arco baleno, Feltrinelli, 1992
 I colpi dei sensi, Fahrenheit 451, Milano, 1993
 Prove di risposta, Edizioni Nuova Cultura, Roma, 1994
 In alto a sinistra, Feltrinelli, 1994
 Pianoterra, articoli, Qiqajon, Bose, Magnano, 1995
 Il cronista scalzo e altri scritti, Legatoria del Sud
 Alzaia, Feltrinelli, 1997
 Ora prima, Qiqajon, Bose, Magnano, 1997
 Tu, mio, Feltrinelli, 1998 (Me, You, Other Press)
 Tufo, Dante & Descartes, 1999
 Tre cavalli, Feltrinelli, 1999 (Three Horses, Other Press)
 Un papavero rosso all'occhiello senza coglierne il fiore, Interattiva, 2000
 Montedidio, Feltrinelli, 2002 (God's Mountain, Other Press)
 Opera sull'acqua e altre poesie (poetry), Einaudi, 2002
 Lettere da una citta' bruciata, Dante & Descartes, 2002
 Nocciolo d'oliva, EMP, 2002
 Il contrario di uno, Feltrinelli, 2003
 Immanifestazione, Dante & Descartes, 2003
 Morso di luna nuova. Racconto per voci in tre stanze, Mondadori, 2004
 Precipitazioni, Dante & Descartes, 2004
 Chisciottimista, Dante & Descartes, 2005
 In nome della madre, Feltrinelli, 2006
 Sulla traccia di Nives, Mondadori, 2006
 Napolide", Dante & Descartes, 2006
 Sottosopra (with Gennaro Matino), Mondadori, 2007
 lettere fraterne (with Izet Sarajilic), Dante & Descartes, 2007
 L'isola è una conchiglia, La Conchiglia, 2008
 Almeno cinque (with Gennaro Matino), Feltrinelli, 2008
 L'ospite incallito (poetry), Einaudi, 2008
 Il cielo in una stalla, Infinito, 2008
 Tentativi di scoraggiamento (a darsi alla scrittura), Dante & Descartes, 2009 (Attempts at discouragement (when taking up writing))
 Penultime notizie circa Ieshu/Gesù, Messaggero, 2009
 Il giorno prima della felicità, Feltrinelli, 2009 (The Day Before Happiness, Other Press)
 Il peso della farfalla, Feltrinelli, 2009
 Tu non c'eri, Dante & Descartes, 2010
 Rivolte inestirpabili, Forum Edizioni, 2010
 E disse, Feltrinelli, 2011
 Le sante dello scandalo, La Giuntina, 2011
 I pesci non chiudono gli occhi, Feltrinelli, 2011
 Il Turno di Notte lo Fanno le Stelle, Feltrinelli, 2012 ("The Nightshift Belongs to the Stars")
 Il torto del soldato, Feltrinelli, 2012
 Il Turno di Notte lo fanno le Stelle, OH!PEN/Feltrinelli, 2012
 La doppia Vita dei Numeri, Feltrinelli, 2012
 The Nightshift Belongs to the Stars, Feltrinelli 2012
 Ti sembra il Caso?, Feltrinelli 2013
 Storia di Irene, Feltrinelli 2013
 The Crime of a Soldier, Feltrinelli
 La musica Provata (A Musical Imprinting), Feltrinelli 2014
 La parola contraria, Feltrinelli 2015
 Il più e il meno, Feltrinelli 2016
 La Faccia delle nuvole, Feltrinelli 2016
 La Natura Esposta, Feltrinelli 2016
 Diavoli Custodi, Feltrinelli 2017 
 Il giro dell’oca, Feltrinelli 2018
 Impossibile, Feltrinelli 2019
 A Grandezza Naturale, Feltrinelli 2021
 Spizzichi e Bocconi, Feltrinelli 2022

 Translations by the author 
 Esodo/Nomi, Feltrinelli, 1994
 Giona/Iona, Feltrinelli, 1995
 kohelet/Ecclesiaste, Feltrinelli, 1996
 Il libro di Ruth, Feltrinelli, 1999
 Salmo secondo ovvero Elogio del massimo timore, in Micromega, 2000
 Noah Ansheldell'altro mondo (of Dovid Katz), translation from Yiddish, Dante & Descartes, 2002
 Vita di Sansone dal libro Giudici/Shoftim, Feltrinelli, 2002
 Vita di Noè/Noa, Feltrinelli, 2004
 L'ospite di pietra. L'invito a morte di Don Giovanni. Piccola tragedia in versi, Feltrinelli, 2005
 Canto del popolo yiddish messo a morte (of Ytshak Katzenelson), Mondadori, 2009

References

External links 
Italian writer faces jail over call for sabotage of high-speed rail line
Sabotaging Free Speech in Italy
 Erri De Luca va in California: 'Tra i vicoli di Napoli e l'America'
 http://www.rai.it/dl/RaiTV/programmi/media/ContentItem-74a41666-90f2-4054-a578-a7ece87ebd25.html?p=0
 The Trench
 THE NIGHT SHIFT BELONGS TO THE STARS
 http://www.cbc.ca/player/Radio/ID/2389925401/
 The Crime of a Soldier
 Italian Poetry 2 de Luca
 https://video.repubblica.it/dossier/la-repubblica-delle-idee-2019/repidee-2019-dialogo-la-scrittura-e-un-impegno-con-erri-de-luca-la-clip/336669/337266
 Per capire un padre devi abbandonarlo (e poi amare il suo puzzo d’aringa)

20th-century Italian novelists
21st-century Italian novelists
Italian translators
Italian male poets
Living people
1950 births
Prix Femina Étranger winners
Translators of the Bible into Italian
Writers from Naples
Italian male novelists
20th-century Italian male writers
21st-century Italian male writers